Anaphalis is a genus of herbaceous and woody flowering plants within the family Asteraceae, whose members are commonly known by the name pearl or pearly everlasting. There are around 110 species with the vast majority being native to central and southern Asia. There is one species native to North America that is fairly well known  and popular in cultivation, namely the western pearly everlasting (Anaphalis margaritacea).

The name probably derives from the common practice of drying the flowers and stems for decorations through winter months.  This plant was used extensively by Native Americans for a variety of medicinal purposes.

Two of the species, A. javanica and A. longifolia can be found on mountainsides on the Island of Java in Indonesia. Anaphalis javanica, also known as the Javanese Edelweiss, is currently an endangered species.

 Species

References

External links
 UVU Herbarium - Anaphalis
 

 
Asteraceae genera